Turi is an endangered Munda language of India that is closely related to Mundari. It is spoken by only half a percent of ethnic Turi, the rest having shifted to Sadri in Jharkhand, Mundari in West Bengal, and Odia in Odisha. The Turi are classified as a Scheduled Caste in Jharkhand.

Distribution
Osada (1991) lists the following locations where Turi is spoken.

Jharkhand (pop. 133,137 as of 1981; then part of Bihar)
Giridih district
Ranchi district
Hazaribagh district
Chhattisgarh
Raigarh district
West Bengal (pop. 26,443 as of 1981)
Odisha (pop. 7,374 as of 1981)

References

Konow, Sten. 1906. Tūrī. In Grierson, George A. (ed.), Muṇḍā and Dravidian Languages, 128-134. Calcutta: Office of the Superintendent of Government Printing.
Osada, Toshiki. 1991. Father Ponette's Field Note on Turi with a Comparative Vocabulary. Journal of Asian and African Studies 42. 175-189.

Munda languages
Endangered languages of India